The Great Ocean Road Open was a new addition to the ATP Tour in 2021.

Jamie Murray and Bruno Soares won the title, defeating Juan Sebastián Cabal and Robert Farah in the final, 6–3, 7–6(9–7).

Seeds

Draw

Finals

Top half

Bottom half

References

 Main Draw

Great Ocean Road Open - Doubles